Elections to the Rajasthan Legislative Assembly were held in February 1990 to elect members of the 200 constituencies in Rajasthan, India. The Indian National Congress won the popular vote, but the Bharatiya Janata Party won the most seats and its leader Bhairon Singh Shekhawat was appointed as the Chief Minister of Rajasthan for his second term. The number of constituencies was set as 200 by the recommendation of the Delimitation Commission of India.

Results

Voter statistics

Elected members

Bypolls

See also
List of constituencies of the Rajasthan Legislative Assembly
1990 elections in India

References 

Rajasthan
State Assembly elections in Rajasthan